Poinard is a former French auto-maker. The vehicles commenced development in 1951, were presented to the public in 1952, and withdrawn from production in 1953.

The car
The only model produced was a three-wheeler urban cycle car which closely resembled the side-car half of a motor-cycle/side car combination. This reflected Poinard's main business as a side-car manufacturer. The driver sat alone on a saddle controlling the front wheel using a motorcycle style handle-bars. Close behind the driver was a bench seat suitable for two narrow passengers, although doubts have been expressed as to whether the vehicle's engine power would have been sufficient to move so many people.

The engine
The Poinard was one of several cycle cars of the period to be powered by an Ydral single cylinder 125 cc two stroke engine positioned to the rear and delivering a claimed 4 hp of power.

References

Sources and further reading 
 Walter Zeichner: Kleinwagen International. Motorbuch-Verlag. Stuttgart 1999. 

Defunct motor vehicle manufacturers of France
Car manufacturers of France
Cars introduced in 1952